Acacia scleroclada is a shrub of the genus Acacia and the subgenus Phyllodineae that is endemic to an area of western Australia.

Description
It has glabrous, straight and ascending branchlets that have striated ribbing that erminate with hard and rigid spiny points. Like most species of Acacia it has phyllodes rather than true leaves. The glabrous, pungent and subrigid phyllodes are a grey-green to blue-green colour. The phyllodes resemble the branchlets and have a narrowly linear to linear-elliptic shape and are narrowed at both ends. It blooms from June to September and produces yellow flowers.

Distribution
It is native to an area in the Mid West and Wheatbelt regions of Western Australia where it is often situated on hills and amonggranite outcrops growing in shallow sand or clay-sand soils.

See also
 List of Acacia species

References

scleroclada
Acacias of Western Australia
Taxa named by Bruce Maslin
Plants described in 1995